Hussain Fariyaaz is a Maldivian journalist and the recipient of the presidential award for Journalism in 2019 with citation for his contribution for development of sports journalism in the Maldives.

Career
Fariyaaz started his career as a reporter in one of oldest printed news outlets in the Maldives, and later served as the editor of Aafathis. He joined the Vmedia group in 2009 as head of the sports department in VTV.
He was the national correspondent for all the major international sports events participated by Maldives including the 2008, 2011, 2013, 2014 SAFF Championship & AFC Challenge Cup. He was appointed as the news director of Raajje TV on 1st January 2020.

Achievements
The best media coverage & news reporting 2007.

National Cricket Board's best media journalist 2014.

References

1983 births
Living people
Maldivian writers
Maldivian journalists
People from Malé
20th-century Maldivian writers
21st-century Maldivian writers